Nguyễn Hải Hòa (born 22 December 1989) is a Vietnamese footballer who plays as a defender for Women's Championship club TNG Thái Nguyên. She has been a member of the Vietnam women's national team.

References

1989 births
Living people
People from Thái Nguyên province
Women's association football defenders
Vietnamese women's footballers
Vietnam women's international footballers
Footballers at the 2014 Asian Games
Footballers at the 2010 Asian Games
Asian Games competitors for Vietnam
21st-century Vietnamese women